The 1997–98 season of the División de Honor de Futsal is the 10th season of top-tier futsal in Spain.

Regular season

League table

*Zaragoza, disqualified for a two non-appearance in a row. Later, the club disappeared.

Playoffs

Goalscorers

See also
División de Honor de Futsal
Futsal in Spain

External links
1997–98 season at lnfs.es

1997 98
Spain
futsal